Kalnište is a village and municipality in Svidník District in the Prešov Region of north-eastern Slovakia.

History
In historical records the village was first mentioned in 1363.

Geography
The municipality lies at an altitude of 210 metres and covers an area of 5.664 km². It has a population of about 555 people.

Genealogical resources

The records for genealogical research are available at the state archive "Statny Archiv in Presov, Slovakia"

 Roman Catholic church records (births/marriages/deaths): 1776-1897 (parish B)
 Greek Catholic church records (births/marriages/deaths): 1839-1935 (parish B)
 Lutheran church records (births/marriages/deaths): 1742-1897 (parish B)

See also
 List of municipalities and towns in Slovakia

References

External links
 
 
Surnames of living people in Kalniste

Villages and municipalities in Svidník District
Šariš